Clapton Chronicles: The Best of Eric Clapton is a compilation album by English guitarist Eric Clapton featuring his hits from the 1980s and 1990s. The album was released on 12 October 1999 by the Duck / Reprise Records label. Two new songs are included on the disc, "Blue Eyes Blue" which was previously released as a single and "(I) Get Lost" which Clapton wrote for the soundtrack to the film The Story of Us.

Track listing (CD)

Track listing (DVD)
 "Forever Man" (Williams) – 5:27
 "Pretending" (Williams) – 4:43
 "Bad Love" (Clapton, Jones) – 5:14
 "Wonderful Tonight" (Live) (Clapton) – 9:16
 "Tears in Heaven" (Clapton, Jennings) – 4:33
 "Layla" (Live) (Clapton, Gordon) – 4:37
 "Running on Faith" (Live) (Williams) – 6:26
 "Motherless Child" (Robert Hicks) – 2:57
 "Change the World" (Sims, Kennedy, Kirkpatrick) – 3:35
 "My Father's Eyes" (Clapton, Climie) – 5:24
 "Pilgrim" (Clapton, Climie) – 5:50
 "Blue Eyes Blue" (Warren) – 4:24

Accolades

Personnel

Babyface – producer
Dave Bargeron – trombone
Jim Barton – engineer
Blumpy – programming
Jeff Bova – organ, synthesizer horn
Steve Boyer – mixing
Jimmy Bralower – drum machine
Michael Brecker – saxophone
Randy Brecker – trumpet
Gary Brooker – keyboards, vocals
David Campbell – string arrangements
Lenny Castro – percussion, conga
Rob Cavallo – producer
Stephen Chase – engineer
Ed Cherney – engineer
Eric Clapton – dobro, guitar, vocals, producer, soloist
Alan Clark – bass, organ, sequencing, synthesizer horn
Simon Climie – keyboards, producer, Pro Tools
Phil Collins – drums, producer, vocals
Luis Conte – percussion
Ray Cooper – percussion
Laurence Cottle – bass
Richard Cottle – synthesizer
Robert Cray – guitar
Darryl Crookes – guitar
Greg Curtis – keyboards, programming, vocals
Jeff DeMorris – engineer
Alan Douglas – engineer, mixing
Tom Dowd – producer
Donald "Duck" Dunn – bass
Nathan East – bass, vocals
Rob Eaton – mixing
Jon Faddis – trumpet
Mike Fasano – percussion
Steve Ferrone – drums
Steve Gadd – drums
Brad Gilderman – engineer
Chyna Gordon – vocals
Mick Guzauski – mixing
Alex Haas – engineer
Lee Herschberg – engineer
John Jacobs – engineer
Jim Keltner – drums
Randy Kerber – synthesizer
Chaka Khan – vocals
Katie Kissoon – vocals
Robbie Kondor – synthesizer
Nick Launay – engineer
Chuck Leavell – keyboards
Gayle Levant – Celtic harp
Marcy Levy – vocals
Mark Linett – mixing
Chris Lord-Alge – mixing
Andy Fairweather Low – guitar
Bob Ludwig – mastering
Steve Lukather – guitar
Scott Mabuchi – engineer
JayDee Mannes – pedal steel
Kevin Mazur – photography
Jamie Muhoberac – keyboards
Tessa Niles – vocals
Dave O'Donnell – engineer
Jamie Oldaker – drums
Michael Omartian – synthesizer
Pino Palladino – bass
Phil Palmer – guitar
Greg Phillinganes – piano
Tim Pierce – guitar
Jeff Porcaro – drums
Jack Joseph Puig – engineer
J. Peter Robinson – synthesizer
Thom Russo – engineer
Joe Sample – piano
Allen Sides – engineer
Henry Spinetti – drums
Chris Stainton – organ
Carol Steele – conga
Richard Tee – piano
Ted Templeman – timbales, producer
Russ Titelman – producer
Paul Waller – drum programming
Lenny Waronker – producer
Norman Watson – photography
Jerry Lynn Williams – guitar, backing vocals, harmony vocals
Dave Wittman – Engineer
Gary Wright – Mixing

Chart performance

Weekly charts

Year-end charts

Certifications

Album

Video

References

Eric Clapton compilation albums
1999 greatest hits albums
Albums produced by Tom Dowd
Albums produced by Phil Collins
Albums produced by Lenny Waronker
Albums produced by Ted Templeman
Albums produced by Russ Titelman
Reprise Records compilation albums